The Lagos State Ministry of Rural Development is the state government ministry, charged with the responsibility to plan, devise and implement the state policies on Rural Development.

See also
Lagos State Ministry of Agriculture and Cooperatives
Lagos State Executive Council

References

Government ministries of Lagos State
Rural development ministries